These 152 genera belong to the family Elmidae, riffle beetles. There are at least 1,500 described species in Elmidae.

Elmidae genera

 Aesobia Jäch, 1982
 Amazonopsis Barr, 2018
 Ampumixis Sanderson, 1954
 Amrishelmis Makhan, 2007
 Ancyronyx Erichson, 1847
 Anommatelmis Spangler, 1981
 Aspidelmis Delève, 1954
 Atractelmis Chandler, 1954
 Aulacosolus Jäch & Boukal, 1997
 Austrelmis Brown, 1984
 Austrolimnius Carter & Zeck, 1929
 Bryelmis Barr, 2011
 Cephalolimnius Delève, 1973
 Cleptelmis Sanderson, 1954
 Coxelmis Carter & Zeck, 1929
 Ctenelmis Delève, 1964
 Cuspidevia Jäch & Boukal, 1995
 Cylloepus Erichson, 1847
 Disersus Sharp, 1882
 Dryopomorphus Hamilton, 1936
 Dubiraphia Sanderson, 1954
 Dupophilus Mulsant & Rey, 1872
 Elachistelmis Maier, 2012
 Elmidolia Fairmaire, 1879
 Elmis Latreille, 1802
 Elpidelmis Delève, 1964
 Elpidemis Delève, 1964
 Eonychius Jäch & Boukal, 1996
 Epodelmis Hinton, 1973
 Esolus Mulsant & Rey, 1872
 Eumicrodinodes Delève, 1965
 Exolimnius Delève, 1954
 Gonielmis Sanderson, 1954
 Graphelmis Delève, 1968
 Graphosolus Jäch & Kodada, 1996
 Grouvellinus Champion, 1923
 Gyrelmis Hinton, 1940
 Haraldaria Jäch & Boukal, 1996
 Hedyselmis Hinton, 1976
 Helminthocharis Grouvelle, 1906
 Helminthopsis Grouvelle, 1906
 Heterelmis Sharp, 1882
 Heterlimnius Hinton, 1935
 Hexacylloepus Hinton, 1940
 Hexanchorus Sharp, 1882
 Hintonelmis Spangler, 1966
 Hispaniolara Brown, 1981
 Holcelmis Hinton, 1973
 Homalosolus Jäch & Kodada, 1996
 Huleechius Brown, 1981
 Hydora Broun, 1882
 Hydrethus Fairmaire, 1889
 Hypsilara Maier & Spangler, 2011
 Ilamelmis Delève, 1973
 Indosolus Bollow, 1940
 Jaechomorphus Kodada, 1993
 Jilanzhunychus Jäch & Boukal, 1995
 Jolyelmis Spangler & Faitoute, 1991
 Kingolus Carter & Zeck, 1929
 Laorina Jäch, 1997
 Lara LeConte, 1852
 Lathridelmis Delève, 1965
 Leielmis Delève, 1964
 Lemalelmis Spangler, 1981
 Leptelmis Sharp, 1888
 Limnius Illiger, 1802
 Lobelmis Fairmaire, 1898
 Loxostirus Jäch & Kodada, 1996
 Luchoelmis Spangler & Staines, 2004
 Ludyella Reitter, 1899
 Macrelmis Motschulsky, 1859
 Macronevia Jäch & Boukal, 1996
 Macronychoides Champion, 1923
 Macronychus Mueller, 1806
 Microcylloepus Hinton, 1935
 Microdinodes Grouvelle, 1906
 Microlara Jäch, 1993
 Narpus Casey, 1893
 Neblinagena Spangler, 1985
 Neocylloepus Brown, 1970
 Neoelmis Musgrave, 1935
 Neolimnius Hinton, 1939
 Neoriohelmis Nomura, 1958
 Nesonychus Jäch & Boukal, 1997
 Nomuraelmis Satô, 1964
 Normandia Pic, 1900
 Notelmis Hinton, 1941
 Notriolus Carter & Zeck, 1929
 Ohiya Jäch, 1982
 Okalia Kodada & Ciampor, 2003
 Omotonus Delève, 1963
 Onychelmis Hinton, 1941
 Oolimnius Hinton, 1939
 Optioservus Sanderson, 1954
 Ordobrevia Sanderson, 1953
 Orientelmis Shepard, 1998
 Oulimnius des Gozis, 1886
 Ovolara Brown, 1981
 Pachyelmis Fairmaire, 1898
 Pagelmis Spangler, 1981
 Paramacronychus Nomura, 1958
 Parapotamophilus Brown, 1981
 Peloriolus Delève, 1964
 Phanoceroides Hinton, 1939
 Phanocerus Sharp, 1882
 Pharceonus Spangler & Santiago-Fragoso, 1992
 Pilielmis Hinton, 1971
 Podelmis Hinton, 1941
 Podonychus Jäch & Kodada, 1997
 Portelmis Sanderson, 1953
 Potamocares Grouvelle, 1920
 Potamodytes Grouvelle, 1896
 Potamogethes Delève, 1963
 Potamolatres Delève, 1963
 Potamophilinus Grouvelle, 1896
 Potamophilops Grouvelle, 1896
 Potamophilus Germar, 1811
 Prionosolus Jäch & Kodada, 1997
 Pseudamophilus Bollow, 1940
 Pseudancyronyx Bertrand & Steffan, 1963
 Pseudelmidolia Delève, 1963
 Pseudodisersus Brown, 1981
 Pseudomacronychus Grouvelle, 1906
 Rhizelmis Chandler, 1954
 Rhopalonychus Jäch & Kodada, 1996
 Riolus Mulsant & Rey, 1872
 Roraima Kodada & Jäch, 1999
 Rudielmis Jäch & Boukal, 1995
 Simsonia Carter & Zeck, 1929
 Sinelmis Satô & Kishimoto, 2001
 Sinonychus Jäch & Boukal, 1995
 Sphragidelmis Delève, 1964
 Stegoelmis Hinton, 1939
 Stenelmis Dufour, 1835
 Stenhelmoides Grouvelle, 1908
 Stethelmis Hinton, 1945
 Stetholus Carter & Zeck, 1929
 Taprobanelmis Delève, 1973
 Tolmerelmis Hinton, 1972
 Tolriolus Hinton, 1940
 Trachelminthopsis Delève, 1965
 Tropidelmis Delève, 1964
 Tyletelmis Hinton, 1972
 Typhloelmis Barr in Barr, Gibson & Diaz, 2015
 Unguisaeta Jäch, 1982
 Urumaelmis Satô, 1963
 Vietelmis Delève, 1968
 Xenelmis Hinton, 1936
 Xenelmoides Hinton, 1936 
 Zaitzevia Champion, 1923
 Zaitzeviaria Nomura, 1959 
 † Cretohypsilara Cai & al., 2018

References